is a Japanese footballer who plays for Renofa Yamaguchi in the J2 League, as an attacking midfielder.

Club statistics
Updated to 24 February 2019.

References

External links 
 Profile at Tokushima Vortis
 Profile at Renofa Yamaguchi FC 
 
 

1989 births
Living people
Miyazaki Sangyo-keiei University alumni
Association football people from Fukuoka Prefecture
Japanese footballers
J1 League players
J2 League players
J3 League players
Japan Football League players
Verspah Oita players
Renofa Yamaguchi FC players
Tokushima Vortis players
Sagan Tosu players
Association football midfielders